Padina may refer to:

Geography

In Bulgaria
 Padina, Kardzhali Province
 Padina, Silistra Province
 Padina, Varna Province

In Romania
 Padina, Buzău, a commune in Buzău County
 Padina, a village in Amărăști Commune, Vâlcea County

 Padina, a tributary of the river Lotru in Vâlcea County
 Padina Șirnii River, a headwater of the Padina Dâncioarei River, a headwater of the Dâmbovicioara River

In Serbia
 Padina (Kovačica), a Slovak-populated village in the region of Banat, Vojvodina
 Padina (Merošina), a village in Nišava District
 Padina (Belgrade), an urban neighborhood of Belgrade, in the municipality of Zvezdara

As a part of the name

In Antarctica
 Kresnenska Padina, a depression in Perunika Glacier in eastern Livingston Island

In Romania
 Pădina Mare, a commune in Mehedinţi County, and its village of Pădina Mică

In Serbia
 Sunčana Padina, an urban neighborhood of Belgrade, in the municipality of Čukarica
 Čukarička Padina, an urban neighborhood of Belgrade, in the municipality of Čukarica
 Vidikovačka Padina, a part of the urban neighborhood of Vidikovac in Belgrade

Other
 Padina (alga), a genus of brown algae